The Blue Line is a proposed line on the Dubai Metro network in Dubai, United Arab Emirates. It is currently approved for construction. This was originally proposed for construction starting along with the Purple Line and completion in 2012.  Due to the recession it was taken under reconsideration and the RTA fixed a deadline of 2014 for completion of this line. However, as of August 2021, construction has not yet started. The Blue line is proposed to run between Dubai International Airport and the newer Al Maktoum International Airport in Jebel Ali, along Emirates Road.

Statistics

The Blue line will be , trains of this line will travel at an average speed of 110 kilometres per hour (68 mph).

See also

Roads and Transport Authority (Dubai)
Green Line (Dubai Metro)
Red Line (Dubai Metro)
Purple Line (Dubai Metro)

References

External links
Dubai Metro Review
Dubai Metro Projects Blue Line

 
Proposed public transport in Asia
Dubai Metro